The 2005 Ladbrokes.com World Darts Championship was the 12th edition of the PDC World Darts Championship, and was held at the Circus Tavern, Purfleet taking place between 26 December 2004 and 3 January 2005.

Phil Taylor went on to clinch his 12th World Championship (10 in the PDC, 2 in the BDO) with a 7–4 final victory over Mark Dudbridge.

The tournament format remained the same as the previous year, with a preliminary round featuring eight international players against eight qualifiers from the Professional Dart Players Association (PDPA) qualifying tournament. The winners were then to meet the players ranked between 25 and 32 in the PDC world rankings.

John Lowe, playing in his last and 28th consecutive world championship, suffered a defeat to Canadian John Verwey. The match went to a tie-break 11th leg in the deciding set.

The final between Taylor and Dudbridge looked for a long time as though it would be as close as the previous year's classic between Taylor and Kevin Painter. Dudbridge led by 2 sets to 1, and having fallen 2–3 behind managed to level again. But Taylor then produced a surge to take the next three sets, and the 10th set provided a mere consolation for Dudbridge. Taylor prevailed 7–4 to claim the £60,000 first prize with his 12th title.

Seeds

Prize money

Results

Last 32

Representation from different countries
This table shows the number of players by country in the World Championship, the total number including round 1 & 2.

References

PDC World Darts Championships
PDC World Darts Championship 2005
PDC World Darts Championship 2005
PDC World Darts Championship
PDC World Darts Championship
PDC World Darts Championship
Purfleet
Sport in Essex